Platyptilia onias is a moth of the family Pterophoridae. It is known from Peru.

The wingspan is about 18 mm. Adults are on wing in August.

External links

onias
Endemic fauna of Peru
Moths of South America
Moths described in 1916